The 2015 Hollywood Casino 400 was a NASCAR Sprint Cup Series race held on October 18, 2015, at Kansas Speedway in Kansas City, Kansas. Contested over 269 laps – extended from 267 laps with a green-white-checker finish – on the 1.5 mile (2.4 km) intermediate speedway, it was the 31st race of the 2015 NASCAR Sprint Cup Series season, fifth race of the Chase and second race of the Contender Round. Joey Logano won the race, his fifth of the season. Denny Hamlin finished second. Jimmie Johnson, Kasey Kahne and Kyle Busch rounded out the top–five.

Brad Keselowski won the pole for the race and led 28 laps on his way to a ninth–place finish. Matt Kenseth led a race high of 153 laps before being spun out by Logano with five laps remaining and finished 14th. The race had 21 lead changes among nine different drivers, as well as seven caution flag periods for 39 laps.

This was the 13th career victory for Logano, fifth of the season, second at Kansas Speedway and fourth at the track for Team Penske. Logano left Kansas with a 13–point lead over Hamlin. Despite being the winning manufacturer, Ford left Kansas trailing Chevrolet by 47–points in the manufacturer standings.

The Hollywood Casino 400 was carried by NBC Sports on the broadcast NBC network for the American television audience. The radio broadcast for the race was carried by the Motor Racing Network and Sirius XM NASCAR Radio.

Report

Background

Kansas Speedway is a  tri-oval race track in Kansas City, Kansas. It was built in 2001 and it currently hosts two annual NASCAR race weekends. The Verizon IndyCar Series also raced at here until 2011. The speedway is owned and operated by the International Speedway Corporation.

Joey Logano entered with a six–point lead over Kevin Harvick. Martin Truex Jr. entered third seven–points back. Denny Hamlin entered fourth eight–points back. Kurt Busch and Carl Edwards entered tied for fifth nine–points back. Jeff Gordon entered seventh 11–points back. Brad Keselowski entered eighth 13–points back. Ryan Newman entered ninth 19–points back. Kyle Busch entered 10th 23–points back. Dale Earnhardt Jr. entered 11th 32–points back. Matt Kenseth entered 12th 45–points back.

Entry list
The entry list for the Hollywood Casino 400 was released on Monday, October 12 at 10:00 a.m. Eastern time. Forty-four cars were entered for the race. All were entered in the previous week's race at Charlotte. The two driver changes for this weekend's race were Will Kimmel attempting to make his second career start in the No. 32 Go FAS Racing Ford and Brian Scott returning to the seat of the No. 33 Hillman-Circle Sport LLC Chevrolet.

First practice

Qualifying

He said afterwards that he was "still kind of shaking. I’ve always felt like Darlington is the hardest qualifying session of the year, but this is harder. You’re right on the fringe of being wide open.” After qualifying 14th, Dale Earnhardt Jr. said that his car "was tight in the middle of 3 and 4 all day, but we were trying to work on it ... and I just barely missed. I liked some things I saw today, and I think the car has good speed.” Casey Mears went to a backup car after hitting the wall in qualifying. As a result, he started the race from the rear of the field.

Qualifying results

Practice (post-qualifying)

Second practice

Final practice

Race

First half

Start
Under clear blue Kansas skies, Brad Keselowski led the field to the green flag at 2:34 p.m. He began pulling away from the field after the first five laps. After 15 laps, Kevin Harvick cued his radio to say he thought there was a vibration in the car and that "it's going to blow up." Despite this, he passed Keselowski for the lead in turn 4 on lap 29. The first caution of the race flew on lap 30 for a single-car wreck in turn 2. J. J. Yeley suffered a right-front tire blowout and slammed the wall. After making his stop, crew chief Rodney Childers told Harvick that the cause of the vibration was a loose right-rear wheel weight. This caution period was longer than normal as drivers were radioing into NASCAR race control that the oil hadn't been thoroughly cleaned up.

The race restarted on lap 40. Joey Logano passed Harvick on the outside in turn 4 to take the lead on lap 51. The second caution of the race flew on lap 64 for a single-car spin on the backstretch. Exiting turn 4, Tony Stewart got loose and spun out. Carl Edwards exited pit road with the race lead after taking just right-side tires.

Second quarter
The race restarted on lap 70. Matt Kenseth passed his teammate on the outside in turn 2 to take the lead on lap 73. The third caution of the race flew on lap 109 for a single-car spin on the backstretch. Exiting turn 2, Kyle Larson got loose and spun out. Kenseth and Logano swapped the lead on pit road, but Kenseth left pit road with it.

The race restarted on lap 115. The fourth caution of the race flew on lap 155 for a single-car wreck in turn 1. Austin Dillon suffered a right-front tire blowout and slammed the wall. Matt Kenseth and Joey Logano swapped the lead on pit road, but Kenseth exited pit road with it.

Second half

Halfway
The race restarted on lap 160. Dale Earnhardt Jr. made an unscheduled stop on lap 165 for a loose wheel. After the race, he said that he felt "pretty sure we had an issue. We had a lot of wheels shaking, tires shaking because of the wheels spinning inside the tire. Every set we had today except for one didn’t shake. Every set shook, but it’s a completely different kind of thing when the wheel is not tight. We don’t know which one it was we came in so quick it didn’t beat up the wheel enough to give us a real indication of which one it was. I knew we needed to come down pit road. We had a fast car, just never really had good track position and got behind.  We didn’t come here to run second or top five we don’t need that we need a win.  We had to try to go out there and win and we just got behind.” The fifth caution of the race flew on lap 170 for a single-car wreck in turn 2. Clint Bowyer got loose, overcorrected and slammed the wall head-on. Describing the incident, he said that he had been "following Gordon there and I started to catch him back. I went in and he kind of took my line away and I tried to pull down and as soon as my headlight got out and got some air in it, man it turned me.”

The race restarted with 89 laps to go. Joey Logano drove underneath Kenseth on the backstretch to take back the lead with 88 laps to go. Kenseth didn't allow him to drive away, however, and took back the lead with 81 laps to go. Logano passed him back to take the lead again with 80 laps to go. The two of them drag-raced through the tri-oval with Kenseth winning the battle with 72 laps to go.

Fourth quarter

Martin Truex Jr. kicked off the final cycle of pit stops with 54 laps to go. Matt Kenseth surrendered the lead to make his final pit stop with 53 laps to go and handed the lead to Jimmie Johnson. He pitted with 52 laps to go and handed the lead to Ryan Blaney. Kevin Harvick was tagged for removing equipment from his pit box – the fuel can got stuck in the fuel receptor and slid out of the pit box – and was forced to serve a stop and go penalty. He said after the race that he was "lucky to come out of it as good as we did with our team. We didn't have a great weekend, a lot of things falling on and off, and now we've got to go to Talladega and have a good week. All in all, it could have been a lot worse, and everybody kept digging." Martin Truex Jr. was tagged for an uncontrolled tire and was forced to serve a drive-through penalty. After the race, Truex said that his team had a "tough day. We were in good shape before the penalty. We fought hard on the car all day got much better right when we got the penalty. We were fast at the end, but not enough time to get back up there." Blaney made his stop with 47 laps to go and handed the lead to Carl Edwards. He pitted with 43 laps to go and handed the lead to Paul Menard. He pitted with 37 laps to go and the lead cycled back to Matt Kenseth.

The sixth caution of the race flew with 24 laps to go for a single-car wreck in turn 2. In front of race leader Matt Kenseth, Justin Allgaier got loose and slammed the wall. Jimmie Johnson opted not to pit and assumed the lead.

The race restarted with 20 laps to go. Johnson was no match for Kenseth on old tires who passed him with ease for the lead. However, Joey Logano was hot on his tail in the closing laps. Kenseth blocked Logano's advance going into turn 3 with six laps to go. Coming to five to go, Kenseth ran into lap traffic and it allowed Logano to close in and Kenseth went up the track to block him again. Rounding turn 1, Logano turned him and send him spinning. This brought out the seventh caution of the race with five to go. After the race, Logano said that the incident was "good hard racing. He raced me hard, so I raced him hard back. The fact that we’re the only team that can relax now is going to pay big dividends going into Martinsville. To make a lot of these guys nervous going into Talladega is part of the strategy." Kenseth spoke on the incident saying that it's difficult "to drive a car with the rear tires off the ground. I was moving around the best I could, Joey (Logano) was a lot tighter, a lot faster on the short run, but we were so much better on the long run. I could still kind of get up to the top and get a run and get around him. We caught those two lapped cars, ‘Crazy’ (spotter) told me I was clear and I was, I pulled up in front of him and he just lifted my tires off the ground and he wrecked us."

Green-White-Checker

The race restarted with two laps to go. Joey Logano drove off to score the victory.

Post-race

Driver comments
Logano said afterwards that the race "was a fun race. What a great Shell/Pennzoil Ford. I couldn’t be prouder of what this team is doing now…That was good, hard racing. We race each other really hard. I feel like I got fenced twice down the straightaways. He raced me hard so I raced him hard back. It’s just hard racing. That’s the way I race. If I get raced like that I’ll race the same way. I just couldn't be more proud of this team. To be sitting in such a good position going into Talladega makes us feel real, real good. The fact that we’re the only team that can relax right now, is gonna pay big dividends once we get to Martinsville. Everyone is a little bit nervous. Our goal is to still win the race. Even though we've moved on to the next round, our goal is still to win that race and try to get some guys nervous for next week. That's the kind of strategy of this Chase.”

Following a seventh–place finish, Ryan Blaney said that it wasn't "a bad run for us. We started off pretty good, we were running up front towards the start of the day and we kind of lost the track position a little bit towards the middle of that race. Our car kind of went away; some of that was traffic and the other part was kind of handling.
“But (the team) did a good job of getting us back where we needed to be, at the end of the race, where it mattered.”

After placing 10th in his 20th and final career start at Kansas Speedway, Jeff Gordon said that his car was "absolutely horrible. We were absolutely as far off as you could be. I don’t know. The thing qualified amazing and ever since we put it in race trim it just is not comfortable, hasn’t felt good, and we’ve struggled with it. That was one of the hardest top 10s I’ve ever had to go through. I’m proud of the team. They fought hard and that’s why we’re where we’re at. But gosh, that was ugly.”

Speaking on the incident with five laps to go, Matt Kenseth – who finished 14th – said that Logano "was a little bit tighter on that short run than I was and I couldn’t get away from him. All day we had him pretty good. I still thought I was going to be able to stay in front of him. I saw those lapped cars coming and tried getting a couple of runs off the top there and I was plenty clear, got up in front of him and he just decided to take us out.” He also added that he "pulled up in front of him, and he lifted my tires off the ground and wrecked me. I won't talk to Joey. I don't have anything to talk to him about really.  I mean, you make decisions every minute behind the wheel. To me, strategically, that doesn't seem like such a great decision for him. But that's how they wanted to win. ... I'm one of the only guys that hasn't been into it yet with Joey. I always raced him with a ton of respect. I actually have been one of his biggest fans. I'm not anymore."

Media comments

Members of the NASCAR media gave their take on the incident involving Matt Kenseth and Joey Logano. Dave Moody of the Motor Racing Network, who had the call on the incident for the radio network, said that "Sunday’s fireworks were a simple case of two drivers racing aggressively and giving no quarter with an important race on the line" and that it was "what stock car racing is all about; two drivers racing their guts out in pursuit of the checkered flag, with no excuses and no apologies. Kenseth did what he had to do to maintain the lead Sunday, and Logano did what he had to do in response."

Larry McReynolds of Fox Sports said that he didn't "see anything wrong that went on there at the end of the race Sunday at Kansas. Naturally, Matt doesn't see it that way and trust me, I totally get it. The man was desperate to get the win to guarantee that he and his team moved onto the next round of the Chase."

Darrell Waltrip of Fox Sports said that he "didn't see anything wrong with what happened. Matt needed to win that race to have any chance to advance to the next Chase round. True, Joey had already punched his ticket to the next round two weeks ago winning at Charlotte. Sure he could have played it safe, backed off and finished second to Matt but why back off? He had a fast race car. The kid is paid to win races for his sponsors, owner and team, plus don't lose sight of this: If he backs off and lets Matt win, then he's going to have to face Matt and his extremely fast Toyota in the next round of the Chase. If you have a chance to eliminate a major competitor for the championship, then that's the smart play. Simply backing off and letting Matt win really isn't a good idea in the big picture.

Jerry Jordan of Frontstretch.com said that the actions of Logano proved he "is afraid of what the Toyota driver is capable of and that he wanted to do all he could to ensure they wouldn’t battle each other in the final race at Homestead-Miami Speedway."

Nate Ryan of NBC Sports said that while there's "no alliterative witticism in the NASCAR vernacular to describe the practice of deliberately impeding another driver’s progress (blocking)," there's "one truism about the maneuver" in that "[i]t comes with consequences.

In ESPN.com's weekly Turn 4 series, five of their motorsports writers answered the question of whether "that Joey Logano dump of Matt Kenseth 'quintessential NASCAR,' as Brian France said it was."

Ricky Craven said plainly that while what happened was great, he's "not of the opinion one driver spinning another for the win can be considered 'quintessential NASCAR.' Ricky Rudd would have 24 wins associated with his Cup career, except a win was taken from him because NASCAR declared his bump of Davey Allison on the final lap at Sonoma a foul. What we saw from Joey and Matt may be an example of 'quintessential Chase,' but not NASCAR."

Ryan McGhee said he doesn't know if he "would go that far," but he "had no problem with it...I think the people that do have a problem with it (at least those who aren't Matt Kenseth) are swayed more by the names involved than what actually happened. If that had been Dale Junior instead of Logano and Kyle Busch instead of Kenseth, everyone else would be saying what France said."

John Oreovicz's answer to the question was a simple "yes" and noted that many of the historic moments in NASCAR did "involve contact and controversy -- the '79 Daytona 500, Richard Petty and David Pearson banging their way to the line a few years earlier, or much more recently, Brad Keselowski's bump and run on Jeff Gordon at Texas last year. Dale Earnhardt's legend was made by the style of aggressive driving that Logano demonstrated on Kenseth, and that's the kind of stuff that France and his marketing executives wish would happen a lot more often."

Bob Pockrass differed with Oreovicz with a simple "no" and that he considers "quintessential NASCAR" to be "Ricky Craven-Kurt Busch at Darlington. Logano was blocked a few times and he made a decision to hold his line to force the issue and dump Kenseth. He didn't clearly have the position and he didn't make a mistake or lose control of his car. It wasn't out-of-bounds dirty, but it wasn't clean. If the points were reversed and Logano had to win to advance, it would have been viewed with much more understanding. As Kurt Busch said Tuesday: 'I'd hate to be Logano at this point because you can win one race. You have got five more after that.'"

Marty Smith said "sure" and Logano technically "didn't wall Kenseth. He put a bumper to him. If Matt wins that race, Joey has to deal with Matt the rest of the way. And Matt can win anywhere. If I'm Kenseth, there's no way Logano wins a championship. But Kenseth is nicer than I am. What Logano did is fine, as long as he knows he has one coming and doesn't moan about it when Kenseth sends him. You heard Logano in Victory Lane at Kansas: he said he was walled twice and wasn't going to stand for it. All's fair when the checkers are in the air."

Race results

Race statistics
21 lead changes among 9 different drivers
7 cautions for 39 laps
Time of race: 2 hours, 58 minutes, 22 seconds
Average speed: 
Joey Logano took home $377,023 in winnings

Race awards
 Coors Light Pole Award: Brad Keselowski (27.621, 
 3M Lap Leader: Matt Kenseth (153 laps)
 American Ethanol Green Flag Restart Award: Joey Logano
 Duralast Brakes "Bake In The Race" Award: Kevin Harvick
 Freescale "Wide Open": Jimmie Johnson
 Ingersoll Rand Power Move: Kevin Harvick (3 positions)
 MAHLE Clevite Engine Builder of the Race: Roush-Yates Engines, #22
 Mobil 1 Driver of the Race: Matt Kenseth (134.1 driver rating)
 Moog Steering and Suspension Problem Solver of The Race: Denny Hamlin (crew chief Dave Rodgers (0.160 seconds))
 NASCAR Sprint Cup Leader Bonus: Joey Logano, ($10,000)
 Sherwin-Williams Fastest Lap: Matt Kenseth (Lap 116, 29.037)
 Sunoco Rookie of The Race: Matt DiBenedetto

Media

Television
NBC covered the race on the television side. Rick Allen, Jeff Burton and Steve Letarte had the call in the booth for the race. Dave Burns, Mike Massaro, Marty Snider and Kelli Stavast handled pit road on the television side.

Radio
MRN had the radio call for the race, which was simulcast on Sirius XM NASCAR Radio. Joe Moore, Jeff Striegle and Rusty Wallace called the race from the booth when the field was racing down the front stretch. Dave Moody called the race from a billboard outside turn 2 when the field was racing through turns 1 and 2. Mike Bagley called the race from a billboard outside turn 3 when the field was racing through turns 3 and 4. Alex Hayden, Winston Kelley and Steve Post handled pit road on the radio side.

Standings after the race

Drivers' Championship standings

Manufacturers' Championship standings

Note: Only the first sixteen positions are included for the driver standings.

Note

References

Hollywood Casino 400
Hollywood Casino 400
NASCAR races at Kansas Speedway